Zannichellia palustris subsp. major, the greater horned pondweed is an aquatic plant found in fresh to brackish waters in Europe.

References

Potamogetonaceae
Aquatic plants
Flora of Europe
Plants described in 1830